WMLM (1520 AM) is a radio station located in St. Louis, Michigan, broadcasting Citadel Media's satellite-delivered Real Country format, a hybrid of classic and current country hits. WMLM mainly broadcasts to the north along the US-127 corridor, and is one of four radio stations to broadcast from Gratiot County.

1520 AM is a United States clear-channel frequency; WWKB in Buffalo, New York and KOKC in Oklahoma City, Oklahoma share Class A status on this frequency.

History
WMLM began broadcasting in 1977 as a daytime-only station and added nighttime operations in 1982. The station originally broadcast from downtown St. Louis on 1540 kHz, moving south of the city in 1983 to its current location on State Road. The station switched to 1520-AM and added six 200-foot transmission towers. In addition to its country-music format, WMLM provides farm and agricultural news updates as an affiliate of the Michigan Farm Radio Network, which the station was affiliated early on.

Original owner Greg Siefker sold WMLM to Krol Communications, owners of WJSZ-FM in Ashley, Michigan, in May 2008 after the FCC gave approval in March. Speaking to the Mount Pleasant Morning Sun, Siefker cited exhaustion and recent health issues as a reason for selling his station, although he was to stay on as a consultant. WMLM had no change in its format following the sale.

Programming
WMLM's features the only "live and local" morning show in Gratiot County. Simply titled "One Track Mind" the program airs weekdays from 6:30-9am, providing Mid-Michigan with local news, sports, weather, and obituaries. The current host is Timothy Mitchell. Former hosts include Dan Manley, Justin Orminski, Tyler Scott, Tallon Weatherby, Isaac McCormack, and Josh Lattime.

The station broadcasts high school sports for local high school Breckinridge, St Louis, and Ithaca. WMLM is also the local affiliate for the NASCAR Monster Energy Cup Series.

References

External links
WMLM 105.9 Facebook

MLM
Country radio stations in the United States
Radio stations established in 1977